The G-400 (or sometimes G400) is an Epiphone solid body electric guitar model produced as a more modestly priced version of the famous Gibson SG. Currently, Epiphone is a subsidiary of Gibson and manufactures the G-400 and other budget models at a lower cost in Asia. Visually and ergonomically, it is almost identical to a 1962 SG.

History 
Introduced in 1989 after Epiphone production moved to Korea in cooperation with the Samick Corporation, the G-400 has been in continuous production for thirty years.

Upon introduction, it featured dot fretboard inlays, two open-coil humbuckers, green key tuners with the Epiphone logo stamped on their backs, a differently shaped truss rod cover with "Gibson" printed vertically, black "speed" knobs, and "narrow-open Book" headstock. By 1990, the G-400 was sporting the modern "clipped-ear" headstock with no holly inlay

In 1996, several features of the G-400 were changed. These changes included black "top hat" knobs with silver inserts, trapezoidal fretboard inlays, chrome covers on the humbuckers, and a "holly" headstock inlay.

Until 2002, the vast majority of G-400s were built in Korea by the Samick Corporation. Now, most G-400s are built in Epiphone's Qingdao, China plant.

In 2002, Epiphone began using Grover tuners on the G-400. In 2004, the truss rod cover was changed to the current shape with "SG" printed on it. In 2005, the logo ink stamped on limited edition models was changed. In 2009, the G-400 (along with several other Epiphone models) made the switch from chrome-plated hardware to nickel-plated hardware. Also, the neck was changed to a "slim taper" profile. in 2012, Epiphone introduced the G-400 Pro with Alnico Classic PRO™ 4-wire humbuckers.

Woods 
The Epiphone G-400 is made of Philippine/Indonesian mahogany (more commonly known as Luan, Lauan or Meranti, botanic genus Shorea which has 196 subspecies), which is not actually related to the mahogany species. In 2005, Epiphone began putting thin veneers of African mahogany on the front and back of the Cherry finished G-400s. G-400 "Vintage" worn cherry / worn brown models manuifactured in Korea from 2002 to 2005 (UnSung and SaeIn plants, serial numbers starting with U or I) have solid three-piece bodies made from Nyatoh (palaquium spp.) without a veneer.

Features
The design of the G-400 follows that of the Gibson SG. Features include dual pointed cutaways, smaller pickguard (but in some cases, such as the 1966 model or any limited edition model, there is still a large pickguard), set neck, trapezoidal fingerboard inlays (late 80s and early 90s models had dot inlays), dual humbucker pickups, and beveled mahogany body. The biggest visual differences from the Gibson SG are the Epiphone headstock and wood-bound neck. The standard G-400, not limited edition, is available in two finishes: ebony and cherry. The Faded G-400 comes in worn brown and worn cherry. In addition, new models now have Grover-brand machine heads.

Variants
The G-400 is available in many models, including G-400, Pro, Deluxe, Deluxe Flametop, Custom, Vintage, '66 Limited edition, SG Special, Tony Iommi Signature, Gothic and an Alpine White EMG pickup outfitted Limited Edition, the latter of which is very rare.

The Japanese-made Elitist G-400 has a slightly different shaped headstock than most Epiphone models.

Faded G-400 
The Faded G-400 features:
 Alnico Classic humbuckers
 Nickel hardware
 Licensed Grover tuners
 Mahogany neck and body
 Set neck construction
 Rosewood fingerboard with "trapezoid" inlays
 24.75" scale
 1.68" nut width
 Colors available: Worn Cherry and Worn Brown.

G-400 
The G-400 features:
 Alnico Classic humbuckers
 Nickel hardware
 chrome tuners
 Mahogany body with African mahogany
 "Slim taper" set mahogany neck
 Rosewood fingerboard with "trapezoid" inlays
 24.75" scale
 1.68" nut width
 Also available left-handed (since 2003, Cherry finish only)
 Colors available: Ebony, Cherry, Vintage White (discontinued), Worn Brown, and Metallic Light Blue (discontinued).

G-400 Custom 
The G-400 Custom (introduced 2000, discontinued 2011) features:
 Three Alnico Classic humbuckers
 Gold hardware
 Licensed Grover tuners
 Set Mahogany neck and body
 Neck and headstock binding
 Rosewood fingerboard with "block" inlays
 24.75" scale
 1.68" nut width
 Colors available: Antique Ivory and Ebony.

G-400 Deluxe 
The G-400 Deluxe features:
 Alnico Classic humbuckers
 Nickel hardware
 Licensed Grover tuners
 Mahogany neck
 Mahogany body with flamed maple veneer
 Set neck construction
 Rosewood fingerboard with "trapezoid" inlays
 24.75" scale
 1.68" nut width
 Colors available: Vintage Sunburst.

Tony Iommi G-400 
The Tony Iommi G-400 features:
 Gibson USA Tony Iommi humbuckers
 Black chrome hardware
 Licensed Grover tuners
 Mahogany body
 "Slim taper" set mahogany neck
 Tony Iommi's signature screened on truss rod cover
 Strap button relocated to top horn
 24 fret rosewood fingerboard with mother of pearl "cross" inlays
 24.75" scale
 1.68" nut width
 Also available left-handed
 Colors available: Ebony.

Limited Edition Models 
Several Limited Edition models have been produced for different licensed Gibson/Epiphone dealers.

G-400 1966 Reissue 

The G-400 1966 Reissue features:
 Neck Pickup Alnico Classic neck humbucker
 Bridge Pickup Alnico Classic Plus bridge humbucker
 Bridge Locktone Tune-O-Matic
 Tailpiece Stopbar
 Controls Neck pickup: 1-Volume with push/pull coil split, 1-Tone/ Bridge pickup: 1-Volume with push pull coil split, 1-Tone w/full-size 500K O potentiometers
 Hardware Nickel
 Colors Ebony, Heritage Cherry, Silverburst, Wood Grain, Alpine White and Pelham Blue
 Tuners Wilkinson Delux 14:1 ratio
 Neck Mahogany Set Neck
 Fingerboard rosewood, 22 fret
 Body Mahogany
 Weight 6.9 pounds
 Strings D'addario 10, 13, 17, 26, 36, 46
 "Batwing" style pickguard
(Note: the neck joint used on this model is incorrect for a '66 SG)

G-400 w/EMGs 

The G-400 w/EMGs features:
 EMG 81/85 humbuckers
 Nickel hardware
 Licensed Grover tuners
 Mahogany neck and body
 Set neck construction
 Rosewood fingerboard with "trapezoid" inlays
 Colors available: Alpine White.

G-400 '65 Reissue w/Maestro Vibrola 

The G-400 '65 Reissue w/Maestro Vibrola features:
 Alnico Classic humbuckers
 Chrome hardware
 Licensed Grover tuners
 Mahogany neck and body
 Set neck construction
 Rosewood fingerboard with "trapezoid" inlays
 Maestro Vibrola tailpiece
 Colors available: Cherry, Ebony w/ gold hardware, Pelham Blue.

G-400 Korina (year 2000 spec.) 
The G-400 Korina features:
 Alnico Classic humbuckers
 Gold hardware
 Korina body
 Set mahogany neck
 Rosewood fingerboard with "trapezoid" inlays
 Colors available: Natural.

SG G-400 PRO Deluxe Limited Edition "1961" 

Specs and Features

 1960s Era “SG” with Mahogany body and neck
 Exclusive Cobalt Fade Blue, Candy Apple Red, Metallic Gold, and Silverburst finishes
 Epiphone Alnico Classic PRO 4-wire humbuckers with coil-splitting
 Top Material: AAA Flame Maple Veneer
 Body Material: Mahogany
 Neck Material: Mahogany
 Neck Shape: "1960s" SlimTaper; D - Profile
 Neck Joint: Glued-In, Set Neck
 Scale Length: 24.75"
 Fingerboard Material: Pau Ferro with pearloid "Trapezoid" inlays
 Fingerboard Binding: 1 Ply Binding / Cream
 Fingerboard Radius: 12"
 Pickguard: 4-layer (Black/White/Black/White)
 Tuners: Wilkinson ™ Vintage Classics 18:1 tuners
 Hardware: Nickel
 Controls: Neck Pickup Volume with push/pull coil-splitting, Neck Pickup Tone
 Bridge Pickup Volume with push/pull coil-splitting, Bridge Pickup Tone
 Knobs: Premium Top Hats with metal inserts
 Bridge: LockTone™ Tune-o-matic/Stopbar
 Frets: 22 Medium jumbo
 LockTone™ Tune-o-matic bridge and Stopbar tailpiece

References

External links

 

G-400
Gibson SG